Hollywood Summer Theater was an American television filmed anthology series that aired on CBS from August 3, 1956 to September 28, 1956. The series was hosted by actor Gene Raymond  Among the actors appearing were Merle Oberon, Laraine Day, Joanne Dru, Rod Cameron, Ricardo Montalban, and Preston Foster.

References

1956 American television series debuts
1956 American television series endings
CBS original programming
1950s American anthology television series
Black-and-white American television shows